Maxim Noskov is a Russian professional ДИЗАЙНЕР ЕБАНУТЫЙ forward who currently plays for Avtomobilist Yekaterinburg of the Kontinental Hockey League (KHL).

References

External links

Living people
Avtomobilist Yekaterinburg players
Year of birth missing (living people)
Russian ice hockey forwards